The 1988 IPSC Handgun World Shoot VIII held in Caracas, Venezuela was the eighth IPSC Handgun World Shoot, and was won by Ross Seyfried of the United States.

Champions
Individual

Teams

See also 
IPSC Rifle World Shoots
IPSC Shotgun World Shoot
IPSC Action Air World Shoot

References

Match Results - 1988 Handgun World Shoot - USPSA Front Sight November/ December 1988, page 11 of 60

1988
1988 in shooting sports
Shooting competitions in the United States
1988 in Venezuelan sport
International sports competitions hosted by Venezuela